The Whirlpool of Fate or The Girl of the Water (French: La Fille de l'eau) is a 1925 French silent drama film directed by Jean Renoir and starring Catherine Hessling as its heroine.

All of the French copies of this film have been lost but English copies continue to exist with complete copies of the intertitles (albeit in English). The intertitles have been translated back into French so that modern viewers in France can still enjoy the film in a way that is as close as possible to the original as it originally screened.

Plot
In an age of canals and barges, the movie takes place in the late 19th century.   The scene opens with the slow progress of a barge making its way down a canal that is lined with oak trees.  The heroine's brutish father, a pole man, is somehow knocked off the barge, where he disappears under the serene and still surface of the water.   The camera lingers on the water, perhaps to detect a bubble or two rise from below, but nothing can be seen of the pole man's last breath.   The death is purely by accident, and although a rescue effort is mounted, his body is not recovered until the next morning.

Reduced to poverty from the loss of her father, the heroine falls back upon her own resources to eke out a simple living by stealing.  She happens upon a rogue who has a similar lifestyle, and they join for a few brief acts of criminal mischief, but he is far more abandoned to petty crimes than she is.

A classic case of mistaken identity leads to the heroine being accused of setting fire to a French peasant's haystack.   Alarmed, the farmer peasant races to all his neighbors to help put the fire out.   A wheeled water wagon is rushed from the village fire station to the scene of the crime, but no one can put out the fire.   The peasants think she started the fire, and rush over to her gypsy wagon, and torch it.   A macabre fire dance ensues as the locals dance around the burning gypsy wagon, shaking their fists at the wagon, not knowing if someone is inside it.

Cast
 Catherine Hessling as Virginia Rosaert 
 Charlotte Clasis as Madame Maubien 
 Pierre Champagne as Justin Crepoix 
 Maurice Touzé as La Fuine 
 Georges Térof as Monsieur Raynal 
 Madame Fockenberghe as Madame Raynal 
 Harold Levingston as Georges Raynal 
 André Derain as Patron du 'Bon Coin' 
 Van Doren as Young lover 
 Pierre Lestringuez as Jef 
 Henriette Moret as La Roussette 
 Pierre Renoir as Farmer

References

Bibliography
 O'Shaughnessy, Martin. Jean Renoir. Manchester University Press, 20 October 2000.

External links
The Whirlpool of Fate at IMDB

French silent feature films
1925 films
Films directed by Jean Renoir
French black-and-white films
1920s French-language films
French drama films
1925 drama films
Canals in fiction
Silent drama films
1920s French films